Old Mans Creek is a stream in the U.S. state of Iowa. It is a tributary to the Iowa River.

According to tradition, Old Mans Creek was so named because it was where Native American elderly men, women, and children hid out during tribal wars.

References

Rivers of Iowa County, Iowa
Rivers of Jackson County, Iowa
Rivers of Johnson County, Iowa
Rivers of Iowa